is a manga series written and illustrated by Noriyuki Konishi, based on Level-5's franchise with the same name. The series primarily follows Nate Adams, who gets the titular Yo-kai Watch, which allows him to see Yo-kai, who are otherwise invisible to the human eye. The series has been serialized by Shogakukan in CoroCoro Comic in Japan since December 2012. Viz Media publishes the series in North America under their Perfect Square imprint, whereas Shogakukan Asia publishes the series in Singapore and Kazé publishes it in Spain and France.

Multiple other manga series also based on the Yo-kai Watch franchise have been released, such as one focusing on Nate's love interest, Katie Forester, one based on the Yo-kai Watch Blasters video game, and one based on the Yo-kai Watch Jam: Yo-kai Academy Y: Encounter with N TV-series.

Main characters 

 – An 11-year-old 5th grader who acquires a Yo-kai Watch while bug hunting in the Mount Wildwood forest. He's portrayed as a relatively average and straightforward character.

 – Nate's self-appointed Yo-kai butler, who had been trapped in a gashapon machine for over one-hundred years before being freed by Nate. In addition to giving Nate the Yo-kai Watch, he also explains the different characteristics and traits of Yo-kai when he and Nate run into them.

 – A cat-like Yo-kai, who Nate and Whisper met at an intersection in Nate's residence, Uptown Springdale. Prior to becoming a Yo-kai, Jibanyan was called Rudy and was the pet cat of a girl named Amy. One day, Rudy was run over by a truck in the intersection where Jibanyan would later meet Nate and Whisper, causing him to become a Yo-kai.

Background and release 
Yo-kai Watch was written and illustrated by Noriyuki Konishi, a Japanese writer from Nagasaki Prefecture, previously known for his work on manga adaptations of series such as AM Driver and Mushiking: King of the Beetles. At the time of the Yo-kai Watch franchise's announcement, the manga, among other media, had already been planned in an attempt to make the franchise long-lasting.

The series first began serialization in CoroCoro Comic, published by Shogakukan, on December 15, 2012, over 5 months before the release of the first Yo-kai Watch video game.

In April 2015, Viz Media announced that they would start publishing Yo-kai Watch in English under their Perfect Square imprint, starting September later the same year, in conjunction with the release of other Yo-kai Watch media and merchandise. A trailer for the English series was uploaded to the official Yo-kai Watch YouTube channel later on October 5. As a teaser to the series' release, Viz Media distributed samples of the series' first volume through some retailers as a part of Halloween ComicFest 2015.

In North America, the first two volumes of the series were released on November 2, after pre-orders were made available on October 27.

Volumes

Reception and sales 
Rebecca Silverman of Anime News Network rated the series' first two English volumes a B−, praising the book's "comfortable narrative patterns for kids [and] nice humor", while criticizing its localization for being "highly formulaic". Silverman was also positive towards the series' art, rating it a B and calling it "deceptively simple and very expressive". Silverman also noted that Konishi would frequently illustrate "grotesquely bulging eyeballs", among other "icky imagery", which she felt made it "thrillingly disgusting" for child readers.

The series won the award for Best Children's Manga at both the 38th Kodansha Manga Awards and the 60th Shogakukan Manga Awards.

Throughout 2014, Yo-kai Watch sold over 2.58 million copies in Japan across its different volumes, ranking it as the 20th best-selling manga series on Oricon's Annual Book Ranking that year.

References

External links 
  at Viz Media

Manga series
2012 manga
Children's manga
Shogakukan manga
Viz Media manga
Winner of Kodansha Manga Award (Children)
Yo-kai Watch